Saint-Laurent-du-Verdon ("Saint-Laurent of the Verdon") is a commune in the Alpes-de-Haute-Provence department in the Provence-Alpes-Côte d'Azur region in Southeastern France. It is on the right bank of the river Verdon, which marks the departmental border with Var. As of 2019, Saint-Laurent-du-Verdon had a population of 99.

Demographics

See also
 Coteaux de Pierrevert AOC
Communes of the Alpes-de-Haute-Provence department

References

Communes of Alpes-de-Haute-Provence
Alpes-de-Haute-Provence communes articles needing translation from French Wikipedia